Sascha Dirk Hupmann (21 April 1970 – 12 April 2020) was a German professional basketball player. From Munich, He played college basketball for the Evansville Purple Aces before turning professional; he also played for the German national team.

References

External links
 

1970 births
2020 deaths
Alba Berlin players
Bayer Giants Leverkusen players
Centers (basketball)
Evansville Purple Aces men's basketball players
German expatriate basketball people in the United States
German men's basketball players
Panathinaikos B.C. players
Sportspeople from Munich
1994 FIBA World Championship players